Torab-e Olya (also Romanized as Torāb-e ‘Olyā; also known as Torāb Bālā and Torāb-e Bālā) is a village in Tayebi-ye Garmsiri-ye Shomali Rural District, in the Central District of Landeh County, Kohgiluyeh and Boyer-Ahmad Province, Iran. At the 2006 census, its population was 214, in 42 families.

References 

Populated places in Landeh County